A general election was held in the U.S. state of Wyoming on Tuesday, November 5, 1918. All of the state's executive officers—the Governor, Secretary of State, Auditor, Treasurer, and Superintendent of Public Instruction—were up for election. Republicans won all statewide offices by wide margins, and with Robert D. Carey's defeat of Frank L. Houx, picked up the governorship following two consecutive losses to Democrats.

Governor

Incumbent Democratic Governor Frank L. Houx, who ascended to the governorship following John B. Kendrick's election to the U.S. Senate in  1916, ran for re-election to a full term. He was opposed by Republican nominee Robert D. Carey, the Chairman of the State Highway Commission and the son of former Governor Joseph M. Carey, in the general election. Carey defeated Houx by a decisive margin.

Secretary of State
Incumbent Democratic Secretary of State Frank L. Houx, who served as acting Governor, opted to run for re-election as Governor rather than as Secretary of State. Maurice Groshon, the acting Chairman of the State Council for National Defense, won the Democratic primary unopposed, and faced Republican nominee William E. Chaplin, the former Register of the Cheyenne Land Office. Chaplin defeated Groshon by a wide margin to pick up the seat for the Republican Party.

Democratic primary

Candidates
 Maurice Groshon, Acting Chairman of the State Council for National Defense, former State Dairy, Food and Oil Commissioner

Results

Republican primary

Candidates
 William E. Chaplin, former Register of the Cheyenne Land Office, former Mayor of Laramie

Results

General election

Results

Auditor
Incumbent Republican State Auditor Robert B. Forsyth declined to run for re-election to a third term. State Senator Ishmael Jefferis won the Republican primary unopposed, and faced Casper insurance salesman Albert H. Stewart, who defeated Deputy Secretary of State Frank H. Westcott in the Democratic primary. Jefferis defeated Stewart by a wide margin.

Democratic primary

Candidates
 Albert H. Stewart, Casper insurance salesman
 Frank H. Westcott, Deputy Secretary of State

Results

Republican primary

Candidates
 Ishmael C. Jefferis, State Senator from Weston County

Results

General election

Results

Treasurer
Incumbent Republican State Treasurer Henry B. Gates was unable to seek a second consecutive term, thereby creating an open seat. Former State Senator A. D. Hoskins narrowly defeated George W. Perry, a banker and the former Chief Clerk of the State Senate, in the Republican primary. In the general election, he faced former State Representative John L. Jordan, whom he handily defeated to win election as Treasurer.

Democratic primary

Candidates
 John L. Jordon, former State Representative from Laramie County

Results

Republican primary

Candidates
 A. D. Hoskins, former State Senator from Uinta County
 George W. Perry, Sheridan banker, former Chief Clerk of the State Senate

Results

General election

Results

Superintendent of Public Instruction
Incumbent Republican Superintendent of Public Instruction Edith K. O. Clark declined to seek re-election, creating an open seat. Katharine A. Morton, the former State Librarian, won a plurality of the vote in the Republican primary and advanced to the general election. No Democratic candidate initially filed to run for Superintendent, but Laramie County Superintendent of Schools Mamie Hefferon won the Democratic nomination as a write-in candidate. In the general election, Morton only defeated Hefferon by a narrow margin, holding the office for the Republican Party.

Democratic primary
No Democratic candidates filed for Superintendent, but Laramie County Superintendent of Schools Mamie Hefferon announced that she would run as a write-in candidate for the nomination one week before the primary. After Hefferon received 600 write-in votes in the Democratic primary, she received the nomination and proceeded to the general election.

Republican primary

Candidates
 Katharine A. Morton, former State Librarian
 Lenore C. Harnsberger, Republican activist
 Thomas B. McDonough, Deputy State Superintendent, 1914 Republican candidate for Superintendent

Results

General election

Results

References

 
Wyoming